Stéphane Kakou (born 5 February 1988 in Saint-Jean-de-la-Ruelle, France) is a French former professional footballer who played as a left-back. He played 16 matches in Ligue 2 for LB Châteauroux and Vannes OC between 2006 and 2011.

References

External links
 
 

1988 births
Living people
French footballers
French sportspeople of Ivorian descent
Association football fullbacks
LB Châteauroux players
Vannes OC players
Luzenac AP players
AS Béziers (2007) players
Ligue 2 players
Championnat National players
Championnat National 2 players